The Painted Cave Fire was a devastating wildfire in June, 1990 that burned in the Santa Ynez Mountains and the city of Santa Barbara, within Santa Barbara County, California. 

The fire, which began near Painted Cave, was intentionally set near at the intersection of Highway 154 (San Marcos Pass Road) and Painted Cave Road, burned , destroyed 427 buildings, and resulted in two deaths.

Timeline of events 
The day had already been a long one for the Santa Barbara County Fire Department which had battled a 3-alarm fire in the county dump. While still mopping up from the dump fire, the call went out at 6:02pm for a brush fire on Highway 154 and Painted Cave Road. On this Wednesday evening temperatures topped off at  degrees, an all-time record for that date, fueling some of the worst sundowner winds ever recorded.

The fire proceeded into residential neighborhoods of Santa Barbara, fueled by sundowner winds, eventually jumping U.S. Route 101 at 7:42PM. It was the largest loss of structures since the Bel Air Fire of 1961. The state fire marshal called it the "fastest-moving fire of its type ever in the United States."

There were two fatalities in the fire. Andrea Lang Gurka, age 37, died while fleeing the flames along San Marcos Pass Road. An unnamed state prisoner working as a firefighter also died.

Investigation and settlement 
Very quickly after the fire started, investigators determined that the blaze was the work of an arsonist and were able to trace it back to its origin. From there, however, the case ran cold and sat unsolved for over 5 years. The case was reopened in 1995 when Peggy Finley, a former girlfriend to Leonard Ross, told her minister that Ross had confessed to igniting the fire in an attempt to "burn out his neighbor" but the fire "got out of hand." After an investigation of Ross, Santa Barbara County District Attorney Thomas W. Sneddon, Jr. decided not to file criminal charges saying that the case against Ross was too weak. However, Ross then sued the county for investigating him and the county saw an opening. A countersuit was filed accusing Ross of starting the fire and the jury ruled in the county's favor, 9-3.

See also
Chumash Painted Cave State Historic Park

References

Wildfires in Santa Barbara County, California
1990 fires in the United States
1990 in California
1990s wildfires in the United States
Santa Barbara, California
Santa Ynez Mountains
1990 crimes in the United States
1990 natural disasters in the United States
20th century in California
History of Santa Barbara, California
June 1990 crimes
California wildfires caused by arson